General elections were held in Liberia in 1893. In the presidential election, incumbent Joseph James Cheeseman of the True Whig Party was re-elected for a second term, defeating Anthony D. Williams, Jr., who ran on the New Republican Party ticket.

References

Liberia
1893 in Liberia
Elections in Liberia
One-party elections
Election and referendum articles with incomplete results